Job Orton (4 September 1717 – 1783) was an English dissenting minister.

Life
He was born at Shrewsbury, Shropshire. He entered the academy of Dr Philip Doddridge at Northampton, became minister of a congregation formed by a fusion of Presbyterians and Independents at High Street Chapel, Shrewsbury (1741), received Presbyterian ordination there (1745), resigned in 1766 owing to ill-health, and lived in retirement at Kidderminster, Worcestershire, until his death.  
Between 1745-1747 he served as the first board secretary, as well as a trustee, of the Salop Infirmary in Shrewsbury. He was buried in Shrewsbury in the churchyard of old St Chad's Church.

Work
He exerted great influence both among dissenting ministers and among clergy of the established church. He was deeply read in Puritan divinity, and adopted Sabellian doctrines on the Trinity. Old-fashioned in most of his views, he disliked the tendencies alike of the Methodists and other revivalists and of the rationalizing dissenters, yet he had a good word for Joseph Priestley and Theophilus Lindsey.

Writings 
Among his numerous works which include sermons, discourses and essays are Memoirs of Doddridge (published 1766), Letters to Dissenting Ministers (ed by S. Palmer, 2 vols., 1806), and Practical Works (2 vols., with letters and memoir, 1842). He was also involved in editting the unpublished works of Philip Doddridge after he died in 1851. He was encouraged in this work by his widow, Mercy Doddridge.

References

Attribution

External links
 Portrait at NPG

1717 births
1783 deaths
Clergy from Shrewsbury
English Christian religious leaders
18th-century Christian clergy